Luc Suplis (born 18 May 1964) is a Belgian judoka. He competed in the men's middleweight event at the 1988 Summer Olympics.

References

1964 births
Living people
Belgian male judoka
Olympic judoka of Belgium
Judoka at the 1988 Summer Olympics
Sportspeople from Hainaut (province)
20th-century Belgian people